The giants' grave of S'Ena'e Thomes is a nuragic-era archaeological site located in the municipality of Dorgali, in the province of Nuoro, Sardinia.

The tomb, dating back to the Bronze Age, has a dolmen structure with a central stele. The large exedra is composed of slabs stuck into the ground and sorted by descending size from the stele. The funeral hall, rectangular in shape and about 11 m length, is covered with large stone slabs arranged in a Jack arch.

External links
 
 
Dorgali, tomba di giganti di S'Ena 'e Thomes (in Italian)

Buildings and structures in Sardinia
Megalithic monuments in Italy
Tourist attractions in Sardinia
Archaeological sites in Sardinia
Nuraghe